The Wapei–Palei languages are spoken in mountainous regions of eastern Sandaun Province, Papua New Guinea. The Wapei languages and Palei languages together constitute a branch of the Torricelli language family according to Laycock (1975) (quoted from Foley 2018).

References

 

 
Languages of Sandaun Province